Aleksandar Jovanović  (born 6 December 1992) is a Serbian footballer who plays as a goalkeeper for Apollon Limassol.

Club career

Rad
Born in Niš, Jovanović started his professional career as a member of Rad, where he spent time from 2009 to 2014. In the meantime he was loaned to Palilulac Beograd and Palić. He made his SuperLiga debut under coach Marko Nikolić, in a match against Red Star Belgrade, played on 3 March 2013, when Filip Kljajić got the red card, and Jovanović was substituted in from the bench. After the 2013–14 season he spent as a reserve for Filip Kljajić and Branislav Danilović, Jovanović started 2014–15 as the first choice of coach Milan Milanović, but after several games and some bad reactions he fell into the background and left the club during the winter break off-season.

Radnički Niš
After a short episode with Donji Srem, Jovanović returned in Radnički Niš in summer 2015 to be a successor of Milan Borjan in front of goal. He signed two-year contract with the club where he passed his youth career. After just 8 conceded goals on 18 matches, Partizan has expressed interest in him.

AGF
In summer 2016, Jovanović moved to Denmark and signed four-year contract with AGF. He made his official debut for new club in the 1 fixture of the 2016–17 Danish Superliga season against SønderjyskE, played on 17 July 2016. After one collision with teammate Dino Mikanović during the 4th fixture match same season, against Esbjerg, Jovanović got a head injury and was substituted out. In May 2017, Jovanović made a record, playing without conceded goal for 423 minutes in the Danish Superliga.

Huesca
On 28 August 2018, it was announced Jovanović signed a three-year contract with La Liga club SD Huesca. On 15 September 2020, he terminated his contract with the club.

Return to AGF (loan)
On the last day of the 2019 summer transfer market, Jovanović returned to AGF on a loan deal for the rest of 2019 season.

Deportivo La Coruña (loan)
On 31 January  2020, Jovanović moved to fellow Segunda División side Deportivo de La Coruña on loan until June.

International career
Jovanović got his first call up to the senior Serbia squad for a friendly match against Russia on 5 June 2016. In May 2018, he was named in Serbia's preliminary squad for the 2018 FIFA World Cup in Russia.

Career statistics

Club

International

References

External links
 Aleksandar Jovanović stats at utakmica.rs 
 
 
 
 

1992 births
Living people
Sportspeople from Niš
Serbian footballers
Serbia youth international footballers
Association football goalkeepers
FK Palilulac Beograd players
FK Palić players
FK Rad players
FK Donji Srem players
FK Radnički Niš players
Serbian SuperLiga players
SD Huesca footballers
Aarhus Gymnastikforening players
Deportivo de La Coruña players
Danish Superliga players
La Liga players
Segunda División players
Serbian expatriate footballers
Serbian expatriate sportspeople in Denmark
Expatriate men's footballers in Denmark
Serbian expatriate sportspeople in Spain
Expatriate footballers in Spain
Serbia international footballers